The Croatian Party of Rights of Bosnia and Herzegovina ( or HSP BiH) is an extra-parliamentary party in Bosnia and Herzegovina that represents the ideology of Ante Starčević. The main goals of the HSP BiH are changes to the Treaty of Dayton, abolition of entities and subdivision of Bosnia and Herzegovina into territorial units.

History

Austria-Hungary
Austrian-Hungarian authorities considered the foundation of the Ante Starčević's Party of Rights (Stranka prava) in the Condominium of Bosnia and Herzegovina undesirable. The group of Croat intellectuals thus founded the Croat People's Union (Hrvatski narodni savez, HNZ) with the goal of establishing Starčević's party ideology. HNZ was mostly supported by peasantry, tradesmen and Franciscans. The party's leader was Nikola Mandić, while other prominent members of the party were Ivo Pilar, Safvet-beg Bašagić, Hamid Ekrem Sahinović and Jozo Sunarić.
Another party which used elements of Starčević's policy was the Croat Catholic Association (Hrvatska katolička udruga, HKU), which was not a secular party as HNZ was. Its leader was Roman Catholic bishop Josip Stadler. HKU established good relations with the Pure Party of Rights in the Kingdom of Croatia-Slavonia and especially in the Kingdom of Dalmatia and also the Catholic-Social Party in the Kingdom of Croatia-Slavonia. The party advocated political Catholicism and unification of Bosnia and Herzegovina with Croat lands.

Pilar and his associates stopped cooperating with the Catholic Association because of their political ideology, even though before that, they had good relations with Stadler. A second reason for the freezing of relations was the effort of HKU to unite Bosnia and Herzegovina with Croat lands, which Bosnian Muslims and Serbs didn't approve of. Since both HNZ and HKU were part of the Pan-Pravaštvo organization, both parties continued to cooperate in 1911 until the end of World War I.
In the election for Bosnian legislature in 1910, HNZ won 12 out of 16 Catholic seats, while HKU won the other four. Safvet-beg Bašagić of HNZ was also a president of the Bosnian council in 1910.

Bosnia and Herzegovina
HSP BiH was founded in 1991 as branch of the Croatian Party of Rights. One of the most notable early members of the party was Blaž Kraljević, a general of the Army of the Republic of Bosnia and Herzegovina and founder of the Croatian Defence Forces in Bosnia and Herzegovina. His unit made significant efforts in defence of Bosnia and Herzegovina. The party's activities during the Bosnian War (1992–95) was marked by efforts to keep unity and friendship of Croats and Bosniaks, its resistance against the partition of Bosnia and Herzegovina between Republic of Croatia and FR Yugoslavia and devotion to unification of Bosnian Croats and the Bosniak state. The Party's earlier political orientation was more nationalist and radical. After the Croatian Democratic Union eliminated Kraljević and had a political monopoly over Herzeg-Bosnia, HSP BiH was dissolved. However, the party's activity was once again established in 1996.

In 2004, HSP BiH changed its name to "Croatian Party of Rights of Bosnia and Herzegovina Đapić - dr. Jurišić", but in 2010, the party took its earlier name.

In February 2010 it was announced that presidents of three parties, Zvonko Jurišić of HSP BiH, Milenko Brkić of Croatian People's Union (HNZ) and Petar Milić of Croatian Union of Herzeg-Bosnia (HZHB), had signed a treaty for unification of those three parties in one party under the name "Croatian Party of Rights of Bosnia and Herzegovina" in Mostar.

Elections

Presidency elections

Parliamentary Assembly of Bosnia and Herzegovina

References

Anti-Serbian sentiment
Croat political parties in Bosnia and Herzegovina
Croatian nationalist parties
Far-right politics in Europe
Neo-fascist parties